The 2017 Ottawa Fury FC season is the club's 4th season at the professional level and its first in the United Soccer League.

Squad

Transfers

In

Out

Friendlies

Pre-season

Mid-season

Friendly statistics

Competitions

United Soccer League

Standings

Results summary

Results by round

Match reports

Canadian Championship

Preliminary round

Semi-finals

Squad statistics

Appearances and goals

|-

|-

|-

|-

|-

|-

|-

|-

|-

|-

|-

|-

|-

|-

|-

|-

|-

|-

|-

|-

|-

|-

|-
|colspan="14"|Players who appeared for Ottawa but left during the season:
|-

|-

|}

Goal scorers

Clean sheets

Disciplinary

Awards

Player

References

Ottawa Fury
Ottawa Fury
2017
Ottawa Fury
2010s in Ottawa